Tootsi is a borough in Põhja-Pärnumaa Parish, Pärnu County], in southwestern Estonia. Before the administrative reform in 2017, Tootsi had a municipality status of its own as Tootsi Parish within Pärnu County. It has the population of 951 (as of 1 January 2009) and an area of 1.76 km².

Until December 2018 Tootsi had a station on the Tallinn - Pärnu railway line operated by Elron located in the neighbouring village of Elbi.

References

External links
Official website 

Põhja-Pärnumaa Parish
Boroughs and small boroughs in Estonia
Populated places in Pärnu County
Former municipalities of Estonia